The music of Tibet reflects the cultural heritage of the trans-Himalayan region centered in Tibet, but also known wherever ethnic Tibetan groups are found in Nepal, Bhutan, India and further abroad. The religious music of Tibet reflects the profound influence of Tibetan Buddhism on the culture.

The new-age 'singing bowl' music marketed in the West as 'Tibetan music' is of 1970s US origin.

History
Western research into the history of Tibetan music has often focused more on religious than secular musics. It has been suggested that Tibetan religious music may have been strongly influenced by West-Asian musics, including those of pre-Muslim Persia (and perhaps even of Byzantium). It has also been suggested that the landscape – and in particular the resonances of caves, with their natural percussive sounding stones - exerted a formative influence on the overtone singing found in Tibetan Buddhist chant (and plausibly also in prehistoric shamanic invocations), which is produced by artful moulding of the oral cavity. The assiduous adoption and evolution of Indian Buddhist traditions and culture in Tibet between the 12th and mid-20th centuries – in a period when Buddhism had disappeared from most of the Indian subcontinent  - allowed the Tibetans to perpetuate musical practices from India that would otherwise have been lost, and to develop them in distinctive ways. Although Tibetan religious music can appear quite separate from the major traditions that emerged in Indian music, some of the musical instruments actually descend from Indian monastic and tantric Buddhist contexts, including, for example, the dril-bu hand-bell, the characteristic hour-glass drums called damaru, and the thighbone trumpet (kangling), as used in the practice of chöd.

The Lama Mani tradition – the telling of Buddhist parables through song — dates back to the 12th century. The songs were performed by wandering storytellers, who travelled from village to village, drawing on their own often humble origins to relate to people from all backgrounds. Vividly illustrated Buddhist thangka paintings depicted the narrative and helped the audience understand what was essentially a teaching.

Tibetan "street songs" were a traditional form of expression particularly popular as a means of political and other commentary in a country that was previously without newspapers or other means of mass communication. They provided political and social commentary and satire and are a good example of a bardic tradition, akin to that in medieval Europe or, more recently, the role calypsos played in the West Indies. As song lyrics in Tibet usually contained stanzas of 4 lines of 6 syllables each, the lyrics could be easily adapted to almost any melody.

Secular Tibetan music has been promoted by organizations like the Dalai Lama's Tibetan Institute of Performing Arts. This organization specialized in the lhamo, an operatic style, before branching out into other styles, including dance music like toeshey and nangma. Nangma is especially popular in the karaoke bars of the urban center of Tibet, Lhasa. Another form of popular music is the classical gar style, which is performed at rituals and ceremonies. Lu are a type of songs that feature glottal vibrations and high pitches. There are also epic bards who sing of Tibet's national hero Gesar.

Musical instruments

Wind

Dungchen (དུང་ཆེན་) or rag-dung (རག་དུང་) - long horn made of copper and/or brass
Dung-kar or dung-dkar (དུང་དཀར་, literally "white conch") - conch shell horn
Gyaling (རྒྱ་གླིང་) - shawm
Kangling (རྐང་གླིང་) or kang-dung (རྐང་དུང་) - trumpet made from a human leg bone, or sometimes wood
Lingbu (གླིང་བུ་) - flute flute made from bamboo, or occasionally wood
Dung-rus gling-bu - flute made from the leg bone of an eagle or vulture
Kha-wang or gugzi - Jew's harp

String
Dramyin or sgra-snyan (སྒྲ་སྙན་) - long-necked fretless plucked lute with 6 or 7 strings
Piwang (པི་ཝང་) - 2-stringed vertical fiddle
Rgyud-mang (རྒྱུད་མང, literally "many strings") - hammered dulcimer

Percussion
Chö nga or lak nga - double-headed drum, which is usually held by a handle in the left hand and struck with a curved stick held in the right hand
Damaru (ཌ་མ་རུ་) - small hourglass drum
Dhyangro - drum used by Himalayan shamans
Dril-bu (དྲིལ་བུ་) - handbell
Gyer-kha (གཡེར་ཁ་) - small decorative bell
Khar-nga (མཁར་རྔ་) - gong
Nga or rnga (རྔ་) - term referring to any drum or ritual percussion instrument
Nga chen or rnga-chen (རྔ་ཆེན་) - large double-headed drum, suspended in a frame and played with two sticks
Rnga-chung - small double-headed drum
Lda man (ལྡ་མན་) - a pair of kettledrums
Rölmo (རོལ་མོ་), also called buk chöl,  bup chal, or sbub-chal - hemispherical cymbals
Silnyen or sil-snyan (སིལ་སྙན་ or སིལ་སྙེན་) - flat cymbals
Tingsha or ting-shags (ཏིང་ཤགས་) - small cymbals
Mkhar-rnga bcu-pa - set of 10 tuned gongs in a frame

Popular and modern

Tibetans have a very strong popular-music culture, and are also well represented in Chinese popular culture. Tibetan singers are particularly known for their strong vocal abilities, which many attribute to the high altitudes of the Tibetan Plateau. Tseten Dolma (才旦卓玛) rose to fame in the 1960s for her music-and-dance suite "The East is Red". Kelsang Metok (格桑梅朵) is a popular singer who combines the vocal traditions of Tibet with elements of Chinese, Indian and Western pop. Purba Rgyal (Pubajia or 蒲巴甲) was the 2006 winner of Jiayou Haonaner, a Chinese reality talent show. In 2006, he starred in Sherwood Hu's Prince of the Himalayas, an adaptation of Shakespeare's Hamlet, set in ancient Tibet and featuring an all-Tibetan cast.

In the multi-ethnic provinces of Qinghai and Sichuan, whose Tibetan inhabitants are regarded as part of the "Amdo" cultural tradition, there is a very strong local scene, mostly exposed through videos on local buses. Amdo stars are among others Sherten (short for Sherab Tendzin)  and Yadong, who both have reached outside the borders of China with their music.

The first fusion with Western music was Tibetan Bells, a 1972 release by Nancy Hennings and Henry Wolff. The soundtrack to Kundun, by Philip Glass, has helped to popularize Tibetan music.

Foreign styles of popular music have also had a major impact within the Tibetan diaspora, where Indian ghazal and filmi are very popular and American rock has produced the India-based Rangzen Shonu. Within Tibet itself, among rock groups the bilingual Vajara (Tian Chu) sextants are the oldest and most famous act. Since the relaxation of some laws in the 1980s, Tibetan pop, popularised by the likes of Yadong (Tibet), Dadon (now living in the US), Jampa Tsering (Tibet), 3-member group AJIA, 4-member group Gao Yuan Hong, five-member group Gao Yuan Feng, are well known. Gaoyuan Hong in particular has introduced elements of Tibetan language rapping into their singles. Alan Dawa Dolma is the first and currently only artist of Tibetan ethnicity to be active in both Chinese and Japanese music industry.

Western representations
Although it is sometimes stated that 'Tibetan singing bowls' date back to a pre-Buddhist, shamanic Bon-Po tradition, the manufacture and use of bowls specifically for the purpose of 'singing' (as opposed to standing bells/bowls that are intended to be struck) is believed to be a modern and non-Tibetan phenomenon. The historical records and accounts of the music of Tibet are silent about singing bowls. Such bowls are not mentioned by Perceval Landon (a visitor in 1903–1904) in his notes on Tibetan music, nor by any other visitor.

Wolff and Hennings' seminal recording Tibetan Bells was followed by the development of a unique style of American singing bowl music often marketed as 'Tibetan music'. This has remained very popular in the US with many recordings being marketed as World music or New-age music since the introduction of those terms in the 1980s. 'Tibetan singing bowls' have as a result become a prominent visual and musical symbol of Tibet, to the extent that the most prevalent modern representation of Tibet within the US is that of bowls played by Americans.

Gallery

See also
 Music of Tibet (album)
 Music of Bhutan
 Dungchen
 Last Train to Lhasa
 Aku Pema
 Sakya Pandita – his 13th-century Treatise on Music provides historical insights into liturgical music theory and practice
 Throat singing#Types of throat singing
 Tuvan throat singing#Kargyraa - is related to Tibetan Buddhist chant
 Tibetan Music Awards
 Undertone singing

Footnotes

References
 Melinda Jin. Tibetan culture more active on domestic, overseas stages, China Tibet Online, 15 November 2013.
 Crossley-Holland, Peter. (1976). "The Ritual Music of Tibet." The Tibet Journal. Vol. 1, Nos. 3 & 4, Autumn 1976, pp. 45–54.

Tibetan music
Tibet
Tibet
Tibetan Buddhist art and culture

pt:Tibete#Música